Arthur Green (born March 21, 1941) is an American scholar of Jewish mysticism and Neo-Hasidic theologian. He was a founding dean of the non-denominational rabbinical program at Hebrew College in Boston. He describes himself as an American Jew who was educated entirely by the generation of immigrant Jewish intellectuals cast up on American shores by World War II.

Biography
Arthur (Art) Green grew up in Newark, New Jersey in a nonobservant Jewish home and attended Camp Ramah. He describes his father as a "militant atheist," but his mother, from a traditional family, felt obligated to give her son a Jewish education. He was sent to a liberal Hebrew School in the congregation of Rabbi Joachim Prinz. Later he attended the synagogue of Max Gruenewald in Millburn, New Jersey. At Camp Ramah, his introductory Talmud teacher was Professor David Weiss-Halivni.

Academic and rabbinic career
In 1957, he began his studies at Brandeis University, where he went through a crisis of faith and sought new approaches to Judaism. It is there that he encountered mystical Judaism. Green's professors at Brandeis included Nahum Glatzer and Alexander Altmann. During his college years, he also met Rabbi Zalman Schachter-Shalomi, who became a lifelong friend and mentor.

After college, Green trained for the rabbinate at the Jewish Theological Seminary of America, where he studied privately with Abraham Joshua Heschel.

Green returned to Brandeis in 1967, earning his doctorate with Professor Altman. His dissertation became his book Tormented Master: The Life and Spiritual Quest of Rabbi Nahman of Bratslav.

In 1968, Green founded Havurat Shalom, an experiment in Jewish communal life and learning that became the fountainhead of the Havurah movement in American Jewish life.

Between 1973-1984, Green taught in the Religious Studies Department of the University of Pennsylvania. In 1984 he became dean, and then president, of the Reconstructionist Rabbinical College in Philadelphia. In 1993, he was appointed Philip W. Lown professor of Jewish Thought at Brandeis, inheriting a chair that had been created for his mentor Professor Altmann. In 2003 he was invited to create a new non-denominational Rabbinical School at Hebrew College.

Green has published both academic works on the intellectual history of Jewish mysticism and Hasidism, as well as writings of a more personal theological sort. Radical Judaism, said to be his most important theological work, was published by Yale University Press in 2010, based on a series of lectures he delivered at Yale University in the Fall of 2006.

Green is also known as a translator and commentator of Hasidic sources and is a key figure in the articulation of a Neo-Hasidic approach to Judaism. His two edited volumes (together with A. E. Mayse) A New Hasidism: Roots and Branches, appeared in 2019, published by the Jewish Publication Society.

Green's works have been translated into seven languages, including Hebrew.  The Hebrew version of Tormented Master (Ba’al ha-Yissurim—בעל היסורים) was an influential best-seller in Israel, where Green visits and lectures frequently.  An expanded Hebrew version of Radical Judaism (יהדות רדיקלית: פתיחת שער למבקשי דרך) appeared in 2016.

Published works 

 

Co-editor. Mysticism, Hermeneutics, and Religion: Studies in Judaism. SUNY Press, 1984.

References

Sources 

Tirosh-Samuelson, Hava. "Interview with Arthur Green," p. 191.
Mayse, Ariel Evan. "Arthur Green, An Intellectual Profile," p. 1.

External links 

Arthur Green's personal website, with copies of most writings, as well as lectures and videos.
Arthur Green: An Intellectual Portrait
Guide to the Papers of Arthur Green (1941- ) at the American Jewish Historical Society, New York.
Devekut.com has a link to the most comprehensive, updated compilation of Rabbi Green's online lectures & interviews

American Conservative rabbis
Jewish Theological Seminary of America semikhah recipients
Jewish education
American Jewish theologians
Brandeis University faculty
Living people
People from Newark, New Jersey
1941 births
Brandeis University alumni
Historians of Jews and Judaism
American historians of religion
Historians from New Jersey
Neo-Hasidism